Saccobolus glaber is a species of apothecial fungus belonging to the family Ascobolaceae.

This is an uncommon European species which appears in summer and autumn as minute yellowish discs only reaching 0.5 mm across, thickly clustered on animal dung.

References

Saccobolus glaber at Species Fungorum

Pezizales
Fungi described in 1794
Taxa named by Christiaan Hendrik Persoon